Monroe is a town located in eastern Fairfield County, Connecticut, United States. The population was 18,825 at the 2020 census.

Monroe is largely considered a bedroom community of New York City, New Haven, and Bridgeport.

History

In 1662, Stratford selectmen Lt. Joseph Judson, Captain Joseph Hawley and John Minor secured all the written deeds of transfer from the Golden Hill Paugussett Indian Nation for this vast territory that comprises the present-day towns of Trumbull, Shelton and Monroe. In 1671, Stratford purchased from the Paugusset Indians the territory which included the remainder of the northern portions of Monroe, Trumbull and Shelton, in what is known as "The White Hills Purchase", and officially annexed it to the Township of Stratford.

Monroe incorporated as a town in 1823. The community is named after James Monroe, fifth President of the United States.

Geography

The Pequonnock River begins in Monroe in Wolfe Park. Monroe borders Lake Zoar, a reservoir on the Housatonic River formed by the Stevenson Dam.

Neighborhoods

Monroe is made up of several neighborhoods:
East Village
Midtown
Monroe Center
North Central
Stepney
Stevenson
Upper Stepney
 Whitney Farms
Zoar

Demographics

As of the 2020 United States Census, there were 18,825 people living in the town. The racial makeup of the town was 
84.6% White, 2.4% African American,
6.2% Asian, and 4.9% from two or more races. Hispanic or Latino people of any race were 6.8% of the population.   

As of the census of 2000, there were 19,247 people, 6,481 households, and 5,346 families residing in the town. The racial makeup of the town was 95.8% White, 0.20% African American, 0.08% Native American, 2.62% Asian, 0.50% from other races, and 0.83% from two or more races. Hispanic or Latino people of any race were 2.20% of the population.

There were 6,481 households, out of which 42.5% had children under the age of 18 living with them, 74.0% were married couples living together, 6.0% had a female householder with no husband present, and 17.5% were non-families. Of all households 14.9% were made up of individuals, and 6.6% had someone living alone who was 65 years of age or older.  The average household size was 2.96 and the average family size was 3.31.

In the town, the population was spread out, with 29.1% under the age of 18, 4.8% from 18 to 24, 29.9% from 25 to 44, 25.7% from 45 to 64, and 10.5% who were 65 years of age or older.  The median age was 38 years. For every 100 females, there were 96.5 males.  For every 100 females age 18 and over, there were 93.5 males.

The median income for a household in the town was $85,000 and the median income for a family was $92,514. Males had a median income of $61,109 versus $41,572 for females. The per capita income for the town was $34,161.  About 1.8% of families and 2.6% of the population were below the poverty line, including 2.6% of those under age 18 and 5.5% of those age 65 or over.

Arts and culture

Notable locations

Stepney Cemetery, founded in 1794 and located near the Stepney Green
Monroe Green, a private park in Monroe Center bordered by churches and municipal buildings.
 The Warren's Occult Museum, a collection of occult artifacts
Village Square Shopping Center, former venue for the Classic Nights Car Club.

Locations on the National Register of Historic Places

 Daniel Basset House – 1024 Monroe Turnpike (added September 23, 2002)
 Monroe Center Historic District – CT 110 and CT 111 (added September 19, 1977)
 Stevenson Dam Hydroelectric Plant – CT 34 (added October 29, 2000)
 Thomas Hawley House – 514 Purdy Hill Rd. (added May 11, 1980)

Places of worship 

The town of Monroe features eleven houses of worship representing numerous faiths.
 Beacon Hill Evangelical Free – Evangelical Free Church of America
 Good Shepherd Lutheran Church – Lutheran
 Faith World Outreach – non-denominational Christian
 Monroe Congregational Church – Congregationalist
 Our Lady of the Rosary Chapel – Roman Catholic
 Pilgrims Pathway Wesleyan Church – Wesleyans
 Saint Jude Church – Roman Catholic
 Saint Peter's Episcopal Church – Episcopal
 Stepney Baptist Church – Baptist
 United Methodist Church of Monroe – United Methodist
 Islamic Community of Fairfield County – Islamic

Government

Monroe is a stalwart Republican town at the presidential level with the longest streak of supporting the GOP in Fairfield County. No Democrat has won the town in over 60 years. Lyndon B. Johnson came the closest in his landslide victory in 1964, having lost the town by only 17 votes to Barry M. Goldwater.

Education

Monroe Public Schools oversees public education and includes approximately 4,000 students, in three elementary schools (Fawn Hollow, Monroe Elementary, and Stepney Elementary), two middle schools (Jockey Hollow and STEM Academy), and one high school (Masuk High School).

In 2011, STEM Academy was opened at Masuk High School as an additional middle school option for Monroe's 6th, 7th, and 8th graders.

Chalk Hill Middle School housed Monroe's 5th and 6th graders from 1969 to 2011 (when it was closed due to shifting population and budget issues). From 2012 to 2016, Chalk Hill was the home of Sandy Hook Elementary School in Newtown following the December 14, 2012 shooting.

Media

The town of Monroe owns and operates the FM radio station WMNR.
The Monroe Courier was the weekly town newspaper until it was shut down in October 2018.
The two local online newspaper are the Monroe Patch and the Monroe Sun.

Infrastructure

Roads

 Connecticut Route 25, Main Street, runs across Monroe from Upper Stepney to the Trumbull town line. The highway starts in Brookfield/Danbury and runs to Bridgeport. From Brookfield through Monroe, it is a 2-lane road, and just over the Monroe-Trumbull border within Trumbull, it becomes a 6-lane freeway which connects to Interstate 95.
 Connecticut Route 34 runs through the northern (Stevenson) section of Monroe. The route begins in Newtown and ends in New Haven, where it connects with I-91 and I-95.
Stevenson Dam, which holds back Lake Zoar, and is the bridge for CT Route 34 across the Housatonic River
 Connecticut Route 59 begins at its intersection with Route 25 in Monroe and travels south through Easton and Fairfield, where it ends in Bridgeport.
 Connecticut Route 110 begins in Monroe at its intersection with Route 111, then travels through Shelton before ending in Stratford.
Connecticut Route 111, Monroe Turnpike, begins at its intersection with Route 34 in Monroe and runs south to Trumbull, where it terminates just north of Bridgeport at the Merritt Parkway.

Parks and recreation 

The Monroe Parks and Recreation Department manages Monroe's parks.

 Webb Mountain Park, a municipal park with hiking trails and campsites
William E. Wolfe Park, a town park located on Cutlers Farm Road and on the northern end of Cross Hill Road. The park includes a public pool, four baseball fields, a football field, a basketball court, a playground, and a hiking trail that leads to Great Hollow Lake. The park includes a barbecue set up on the grass, and a nearby pavilion. Great Hollow Lake is located in the south-western area of the park.
The Housatonic Railway Trail is an approximately five-mile section of the scenic walking and biking Pequonnock River trail that runs from Great Hollow Lake in Wolfe Park through the Newtown Town line.

Emergency services

Fire department

Monroe is protected by three independent and all-volunteer fire departments operating out of six fire stations.

In 1916, 45 men and women formed the first volunteer fire company in Monroe, the Stepney Volunteer Fire Company. In 1923 the Stepney Company built its own firehouse, which housed their first fire truck. It is the only Ladder Company in the Town of Monroe. Also in 1923, the Monroe Volunteer Fire Department was established.

Emergency medical services

Monroe is served by the Monroe Volunteer Emergency Medical Service, founded 1977.

Police department

Officially organized in 1952, the Monroe Police Department operates out of Monroe Town Hall.

Notable people

 Mike Gminski, former Duke basketball standout and NBA player
 Mary O'Hara, author of My Friend Flicka and other books; lived on an estate called Tyrawley on Bagburn Hill Road for nearly 20 years
 Jesse Schwartz, the voice of Leo on Little Einsteins
 Ed and Lorraine Warren, paranormal investigators and authors
 Ed Wojna, former Major League pitcher

Images

See also

References

Further reading

 Reverend Samuel Orcutt, A History of Stratford and the City of Bridgeport Connecticut, Fairfield Historical Society, 1886
 The New York Times feature about Monroe

External links

 Town of Monroe official website

 
Towns in Connecticut
Towns in Fairfield County, Connecticut
Towns in the New York metropolitan area